Cheroor is a residential area situated in the City of Kasaragod in the state of Kerala in India.

See also
Thrissur
Thrissur District
List of Thrissur Corporation wards

References

Suburbs of Thrissur city